St. Mary's is an electoral ward of Trafford covering most of the southern half of Ashton upon Mersey in Sale.

The ward was created in 2004 largely from the old St. Martin's ward and parts of the old Mersey St. Mary's ward.

Councillors 
As of 2022, the councillors are Rob Duncan (Conservative), Dan Bunting (Conservative), and John Holden (Conservative).

 indicates seat up for re-election.

Elections in the 2020s

May 2022

May 2021

Elections in the 2010s

May 2019

May 2018

May 2016

May 2015

May 2014

May 2012

May 2011

May 2010

Elections in the 2000s

May 2008

May 2007

May 2006

June 2004

References

External links
Trafford Council

Wards of Trafford
2004 establishments in England